The Men's points race competition at the 2021 UCI Track Cycling World Championships was held on 22 October 2021.

Results
The race was started at 18:32. 160 (40 km) laps were raced with 16 sprints.

References

Men's points race